Frederick Knight (born August 15, 1944, Birmingham, Alabama, United States) is an American R&B singer, songwriter, and record producer.

Biography
Knight recorded with Mercury and Capitol in New York before signing with Stax Records in 1972. He had his only UK hit single, "I've Been Lonely for So Long", in 1972. The song was on the chart for 10 weeks and reached number 22. Lack of further chart activity leaves him labelled as a one-hit wonder. However, Knight did appear in the documentary film Wattstax, which was released in 1973.

After Stax's demise Knight launched Juana Records, writing and producing The Controllers, and he had a UK Number 1 chart credit with Anita Ward's "Ring My Bell" in 1979. Knight cut "I've Been Lonely for So Long" in Birmingham, Alabama, with a seasoned southern soul crew behind him, and hit again in 1975 with "I Betcha Didn't Know That".

The song "Be for Real", written by Knight and originally performed by Marlena Shaw on her 1976 album, Just a Matter of Time, was covered by Leonard Cohen for his 1992 album The Future; and subsequently by The Afghan Whigs for the 1996 movie, Beautiful Girls.

Discography

Studio albums
 I've Been Lonely for So Long (Stax Records, 1973)
 Knight Kap (Juana Records, 1977)
 Let the Sunshine In (Juana Records, 1978)
 Knight Time (Juana Records, 1981)

Compilation album
 The Timeless Soul Collection (1987)

Singles

See also
 One-hit wonders in the UK

References

External links
 Frederick Knight biography by Bill Dahl, discography and album reviews, credits & releases at AllMusic
 Frederick Knight discography, album releases & credits at Discogs
 Frederick Knight albums to be listened as stream on Spotify

1944 births
Living people
Record producers from Alabama
American male pop singers
American rhythm and blues singers
American rhythm and blues singer-songwriters
Musicians from Birmingham, Alabama
Stax Records artists
American male singer-songwriters
Singer-songwriters from Alabama